"Hometown Kids" is a song co-written and recorded by Canadian country duo The Reklaws. The duo wrote the song with Gavin Slate and Travis Wood. It was the lead single off their debut studio album Freshman Year.

Background
Stuart Walker told The Boot that the sibling duo "wanted everybody to understand that we are just college kids at heart". It was the first song they wrote with prolific Canadian country songwriters Gavin Slate and Travis Wood. Jenna Walker said the song is "important to us because it was our first major, like, [time to] sit down [and] really configure who we are as artists and what we want to say".

Critical reception
Jenna Melanson of Canadian Beats Media called the song the "perfect summer anthem". Mary Ayers of Teenplicity referred to the track as a "joyful country jam" that "creates a yearning for fun summer nights with friends". Canadian Prime Minister Justin Trudeau added the song to his personal Spotify playlist.

Music video
The official music video for "Hometown Kids" premiered on August 17, 2017. It features Jenna Walker and Stuart Walker of the Reklaws, as well as forty of their closest friends. The video was filmed in their hometown of Cambridge, Ontario and directed by Ben Knechtel.

Credits and personnel
Credits adapted from Freshman Year CD booklet.

Todd Clark — production, engineering, programming, backing vocals
Anthony Lucido — bass guitar
Andrew Mendelson — mastering
Justin Niebank — mixing
Gavin Slate — banjo, programming, backing vocals, production, engineering
Jenna Walker — lead vocals
Stuart Walker — lead vocals
Derek Wells — guitar, mandolin
Travis Wood — backing vocals

Chart performance
"Hometown Kids" reached a peak of #16 on the Billboard Canada Country chart for the week of December 9, 2017.

References

2017 songs
2017 debut singles
The Reklaws songs
Universal Music Canada singles
Songs written by Todd Clark
Songs written by Gavin Slate 
Songs written by Jenna Walker
Songs written by Stuart Walker (singer)
Songs written by Travis Wood (songwriter)
Song recordings produced by Todd Clark